Coveñas is a Resort town and municipality located in the Sucre Department, northern Colombia. It was established in the 16th century as a port for slave traders, then it became an oil port in the twentieth century . It became a municipality in 2002. The town is now a popular resort for the people of the Colombian Andean region.

History 
The area was founded in 1560 as a slave port.  Then in the mid 1800s, after slavery was made illegal, it became a meat trading port.  In 1971, oil was discovered in the area, and soon, many Colombian oil companies started to settle there.  In the late 1970s, hotels were built to promote tourism.  It became a town and municipality in 2002.

Tourism 
Coveñas has undergone significant tourist development since the 1960s, initially oriented more towards the local and regional population. Since the 70s, due to the characteristics of its sea, its beaches and the existence of a more appropriate infrastructure to offer services and amenities to tourists, this field of the Coveñas economy began to grow in importance nationally and in the 21st century the hotel industry has increased significantly, offering tourist services more suited to current demands. The administration of the municipality has in tourism, a very important source of development possibilities in which to intervene in a positive manner so that it will benefit the community and the region. This line of the economy should be one of the priorities of investment and support of the municipality.

Transportation 
There are many bus services that go from Tolú.  There are also boats, however, there are no marinas in the area.  A boat can come from Tolú and come straight to the beaches.  People will have to go on the beaches and walk out into shallow waters to get on their boat.  The town is served by Coveñas Airport, which is a military airport that offers some charter flights from time to time.

References
 Gobernacion de Sucre - Coveñas

Port cities in the Caribbean
Sucre
Populated places established in 1560